The term  Islamic republic has been used in different ways. Some Muslim religious leaders have used it as the name for a theoretical form of Islamic theocratic government enforcing sharia, or laws compatible with sharia. The term has also been used  for a sovereign state taking a
compromise position between a purely Islamic caliphate and a secular, nationalist republic --  neither an Islamic monarchy nor secular republic. In other cases it is used merely as a symbol of cultural identity. 

There are also a number of states where Islam is the state religion and that are (at least partly) ruled by Islamic laws, but carry only "republic" in their official names, not "Islamic republic" — examples include Iraq, Yemen and Maldives. Other supporters of strict sharia law, (such as the Taliban), prefer the title "Islamic emirate", as emirates were common throughout Islamic history and "republic" has a Western origin --   coming from the Roman indicating that the "supreme power is held by the people and their elected representatives", with no mention of obedience to Allah or sharia law.

Currently, (as of 2022), the name is used in the official title of three states -- the Islamic Republics of Iran, Pakistan, and Mauritania. Pakistan first adopted the title under the constitution of 1956. Mauritania adopted it on 28 November 1958. Iran adopted it after the 1979 Iranian Revolution that overthrew the Pahlavi dynasty.  Despite having similar names, the countries differ greatly in their governments and laws.
Of the three, two of which, Iran and Mauritania are religious theocratic states.  When Pakistan adopted the name in 1956, Islam was yet to be declared the state religion since gaining independence in 1947; they did so upon adopting a new constitution in 1973.

Iran officially uses the full title in all governance names referring to the country (e.g. the Islamic Republic of Iran Army or the Islamic Republic of Iran Broadcasting); as opposed to its equivalents in Pakistan which are called the Pakistan Armed Forces and the Pakistan Broadcasting Corporation. Also unlike the other countries, Iran  uses the IRI acronym (Islamic Republic of Iran) as part of official acronyms.

List of current Islamic republics

Iran 

The creation of the Islamic Republic of Iran was a dramatic, historical event, following the overthrow of the  Pahlavi dynasty in 1979 by the Islamic revolution led by Ayatollah Ruhollah Khomeini. "Islamic" in the country's title was not a symbol of cultural identity,   but indicated specific governmental system based on rule by Islamic jurists enforcing Islamic law. The system was based on The Jurist's Guardianship: Islamic Government, a work of the revolution's leader Ayatollah Ruhollah Khomeini, written before Khomeini came to power, and known by Khomeini's followers but not by the general public. It argued that rather than elections and legislators, Islam required traditional Islamic law (sharia), and proper enforcement of sharia required a leading Islamic jurist (faqih) (such as Khomeini himself, who served as the first faqih "guardian" or Supreme Leader of Iran) to provide political "guardianship" (wilayat or velayat) over the people and nation (wilayat al-faqih). All the Muslim world should be united in such a state. With it, the entire non-Muslim world will evidentially  "capitulate" to its courage and vigour; without it, Islam would fall victim to heresy, "obsolescence and decay".

The new government held a referendum for public approval to change Iran from a monarchy to an Islamic republic in March 1979, two months after the  Islamic Revolution took power. While some political groups had suggested various names for the ideology of the Iranian revolution such as the Republic (without specifying Islam) or the Democratic Republic;  Khomeini called for Iranians to vote for the name Islamic Republic, "not a word more and not a word less".  When an Iranian journalist asked Khomeini what exactly Islamic Republic meant, Khomeini stated that the term republic has the same sense as other uses and Islamic republic has considered both Islamic ideology and the choice of people.
The day after the vote was complete, it was announced that 98.2% of the Iranian voters had voted to approve the new name.

Unlike Khomeini's original vision, the Islamic Republic is a "republic" with elections (Khomeini had originally described his "Islamic government" as "not ... based on the approval of laws in accordance with the opinion of the majority"); it has a  The Islamic Republic also contains many trapings of a modern state -- a president, cabinet and legislature (Khomeini mentioned none of these except for the legislature, which his government would not have because "no one has the right to legislate ... except ... the Divine Legislator"). Some, however, have argued that the legislature (and president, etc.) has been kept in a subordinate position in keeping with Khomeini's idea of government being a guardianship by jurists.

According to the constitution, the Islamic Republic of Iran is a system based on the following beliefs:

Mauritania 
The Islamic Republic of Mauritania is a country in the Maghreb region of western North Africa.  Mauritania was declared an independent state as the Islamic Republic of Mauritania, on November 28, 1960. Its  legal system is "a mix of French civil law and Sharia Law", and its Penal Code punishes crimes against religion and “good morals” with "harsh sentences". "Heresy or apostasy (including in print) are "punishable by death".

Pakistan 
Pakistan was created as a homeland for the Muslims of British India,  when British India was given independence, making Islam its raison d'être. It was the first country to adopt the adjective Islamic to modify its republican status under its otherwise secular constitution in 1956. Despite this definition, the country did not have a state religion until 1973, when a new constitution, more democratic and less secular, was adopted. Pakistan only uses the Islamic name on its passports, visas and coins. Although Islamic Republic is specifically mentioned in the constitution of 1973, all government documents are prepared under the name of the Government of Pakistan. The Constitution of Pakistan, Part IX, Article 227 states: "All existing laws shall be brought in conformity with the Injunctions of Islam as laid down in the Quran and Sunnah, in this Part referred to as the Injunctions of Islam, and no law shall be enacted which is repugnant to such Injunctions".

Former

Chechen Republic of Ichkeria 
The Chechen Republic of Ichkeria used an Islamic republic government system from 1996 to 2000.

Comoros 
Between 1978 and 2001, the Comoros was the Federal and Islamic Republic of the Comoros.

East Turkestan 
The Turkic Uyghur- and Kirghiz-controlled Turkish Islamic Republic of East Turkestan was declared in 1933 as an independent Islamic republic by Sabit Damulla Abdulbaki and Muhammad Amin Bughra. However, the Chinese Muslim 36th Division of the National Revolutionary Army defeated their armies and destroyed the republic during the Battles of Kashgar, Yangi Hissar and Yarkand. The Chinese Muslim Generals Ma Fuyuan and Ma Zhancang declared the destruction of the rebel forces and the return of the area to the control of the Republic of China in 1934, followed by the executions of the Turkic Muslim Emirs Abdullah Bughra and Nur Ahmad Jan Bughra. The Chinese Muslim General Ma Zhongying then entered the Id Kah Mosque in Kashgar and lectured the Turkic Muslims on being loyal to the Nationalist Government.

Afghanistan 
Afghanistan was an Islamic republic from 1990 to 1996, and from 2001 to 2021. The 1990 constitution was imposed by the Mohammad Najibullah government and eliminated communism.

The constitution formed in 2004 was very similar to the 1964 Constitution of Afghanistan, created when Afghanistan was a constitutional Islamic monarchy. It consisted of three branches, the executive, the legislative and the judicial. The National Assembly was the legislature, a bicameral body having two chambers, the House of the People and the House of Elders. The Islamic prefix to Republic was considered symbolic as it was a name supported by pro-Mujahideen delegates during the assembly of forming the constitution.

From 1996 to the re-establishment of the Islamic republic in 2001, Afghanistan was ruled by the Taliban, a militant group based in Kandahar, who governed Afghanistan as an Islamic theocracy officially known as the Islamic Emirate of Afghanistan. In 2021, the Taliban initiated a month-long insurgency to effectively end the Islamic republic and ultimately, re-establish the Islamic Emirate in August 2021. The Islamic Republic continued to be recognized by the United Nations as the legitimate government of Afghanistan both from 1996 to 2001 and from 2021 onwards.

The Gambia 
In December 2015, the then-president Yahya Jammeh declared The Gambia to be an Islamic republic. Jammeh said that the move was designed to distance the West African state from its colonial past, that no dress code would be imposed and that citizens of other faiths would be allowed to practice freely. However, he later ordered all female government employees to wear headscarves before rescinding the decision shortly after. The announcement of an Islamic republic has been criticized as unconstitutional by at least one opposition group. After the removal of Jammeh in 2017, his successor Adama Barrow said the Gambia would no longer be an Islamic republic.

See also 
 Application of sharia by country
 Christian republic
 Guardianship of the Islamic Jurist
 Halachic state
 Islamic state
 Islamism
 Islamic religious police
 Political aspects of Islam

References

Citations

Bibliography

External links 
 Islam and Politics from the Dean Peter Krogh Foreign Affairs Digital Archives
 Constitution of Iran as an unofficial English translation hosted at University of Bern, Switzerland (with good summaries)

 
1956 introductions
Political terminology in Pakistan
Republic